Jason James Mackie (born 25 December 1968) is a New Zealand former rugby league footballer.

Playing career
He represented Northland 18 times between 1990 and 1993 scoring 14 tries. During the 1991 season he was based in Devonport with the Navy and traveled to Whangarei for matches and training. In 1993 he captained the province to the North Island Second Division title and was also the player-coach of the Takahiwai Warriors who won the Northland Rugby League club competition. In 1990 Mackie represented the New Zealand Māori side against the touring Great Britain side. He later played in the 1992 Pacific Cup.

In 1993 he was the only second division player to be selected on the New Zealand national rugby league team tour of Great Britain and France and became Northland's first ever test player. He played in all four tests on tour.

In 1994 he was signed by the Auckland Warriors who were to enter the Australian Rugby League premiership in 1995. He moved south to Auckland and played for the Auckland City Vulcans in the 1994 Lion Red Cup. He was in the inaugural team for the Warriors when they made their debut in March, 1995. However, he played the majority of his Warriors career in the reserve grade team and was released in June 1996.

In 1997 he again represented Northland.

References

1968 births
Living people
Auckland rugby league team players
New Zealand national rugby league team players
New Zealand rugby league players
New Zealand Warriors players
Northland rugby league team players
Northern Districts rugby league team players
Royal New Zealand Navy personnel
Rugby league locks
Rugby league players from Northland Region
Place of birth missing (living people)